John Smallpage Buckley (born August 3, 1953) is an American attorney and a former Republican member of the Virginia House of Delegates. At age 26, he was the youngest member of that body, when he won election in 1979. He is the former chief of staff to the United States Court of Federal Claims.

West Virginia politics
In 2014, Buckley ran in neighboring West Virginia as the Libertarian candidate for US Senate, he came in third with 7,409 votes. In 2016, Buckley was the Libertarian nominee for West Virginia Secretary of State. Buckley was endorsed by the Charleston Gazette-Mail, West Virginia's largest newspaper.

Personal life
Buckley is gay and lives with a same-sex partner. He is the cousin of William F. Buckley.

References

External links
 Ballotpedia

1953 births
Living people
Buckley family
Gay politicians
Republican Party members of the Virginia House of Delegates
West Virginia Libertarians